Hammel is a town in central Denmark with a population of 6,854 (1 January 2022), and a former railway town at the Aarhus-Hammel-Thorsø railroad which was closed in 1956. The town is located in Favrskov municipality in Jutland. Until 1 January 2007 it was also the site of the municipal council of the now former Hammel Municipality.

Notable people 
 Dr. Timen Stiddem (born 1610 in Hammel) a prominent citizen and doctor in Wilmington, Delaware, arrived in New Sweden in 1654 and is recorded as the first physician in Delaware
 Johan Bartholdy (1853 in Hammel – 1904) an organist, composer, singing teacher, conductor and author
 Chris Anker Sørensen (born 1984 in Hammel - 2021) a Danish professional road bicycle racer
 Gitte Sunesen (born 1971 in Hammel) a former team handball player, team gold medallist at the 1996 Summer Olympics

External links
 Official municipality website

References

Municipal seats of the Central Denmark Region
Municipal seats of Denmark
Towns and settlements in Favrskov Municipality
Favrskov Municipality